Stenanthemum stipulosum is a species of flowering plant in the family Rhamnaceae and is endemic to inland Western Australia. It is an erect or low-lying shrub with densely hairy young stems, egg-shaped with the narrower end towards the base, and clusters of 10 to 30 densely hairy white or cream-coloured flowers, sometimes surrounded by whitish floral leaves.

Description
The upper surface is covered with minute, star-shaped hairs, the lower surface pale green or rust-coloured.

Taxonomy and naming
Stenanthemum stipulosum was first formally described in 1995 by Barbara Lynette Rye in the journal Nuytsia from specimens collected by Charles Gardner, near Boorabbin in 1945. The specific epithet (stipulosum) means "many small stipules".

Distribution and habitat
This species grows in shrubland and mallee woodland on ridges and plains in sandy soil between Kulin, Coolgardie and Menzies, in the Avon Wheatbelt, Coolgardie, Mallee, Murchison and Yalgoo bioregions of inland Western Australia.

Conservation status
Stenanthemum stipulosum is listed as "not threatened" by the Government of Western Australia Department of Biodiversity, Conservation and Attractions.

References

stipulosum
Rosales of Australia
Flora of Western Australia
Plants described in 1995
Taxa named by Barbara Lynette Rye